The Papaveraceae  are an economically important family of about 42 genera and approximately 775 known species of flowering plants in the order Ranunculales, informally known as the poppy family. The family is cosmopolitan, occurring in temperate and subtropical climates (mostly in the northern hemisphere), but almost unknown in the tropics. Most are herbaceous plants, but a few are shrubs and small trees. The family currently includes two groups that have been considered to be separate families: Fumariaceae and Pteridophyllaceae.

Description 
The plants may be annual, biennial, or perennial. Usually herbaceous, a few species form shrubs or evergreen trees. They are laticiferous, producing latex, which may be milky or watery, coloured or plain. All parts contain a well-developed duct system (these ducts are called "laticifers"), producing a milky latex, a watery white, yellow or red juice.

The simple leaves are alternate or sometimes whorled. They have petioles and are not enclosed by a sheath. The leaves are usually lobed or pinnatifid (i.e. consisting of several not entirely separate leaflets), or much divided. There are no stipules.

The plants are hermaphroditic and are pollinated mostly by insects (entomophilous); flower nectaries are lacking. A few are wind pollinated (anemophilous). There is a distinct calyx and corolla, except in Macleaya where the corolla is lacking. The flowers are medium-sized or large. The terminal flowers are solitary in many species. In others the terminal inflorescence is cymose or racemose. The flowers are odourless and regular.

There are many stamens, mostly 16 to 60, arranged in two separate whorls, the outer one with stamens alternating with petals, the inner one opposite, or numerous in the subfamily Papaveroideae. The gynoecium consists of a compound pistil with 2 to 100 carpels. The ovary is superior and unilocular. The ovary is either stemless (sessile) or on a short stem (stipitate).

The non-fleshy fruit is usually a capsule, breaking open at maturity to release the seeds through pores (poricidal), through the partitions between the cells (septicidal), or by means of valves (valvular). The numerous seeds are small. Their nutritive tissue (endosperm) is oily and farinose. The fruit of Platystemon is a schizocarp.

The basic  chromosome number, x, is 6, 7, 8, 9, 10 and 11, up to 12n = 84 (dodecaploidy) in species of Papaver, Argemone and Meconopsis.

Taxonomy 
The APG III system (2009; unchanged from the APG II system of 2003 and the APG system of 1998) places the family in the order Ranunculales, in the clade eudicots. The Papaveraceae differ from the rest of the Ranunculales in some important characteristics but they share others such as the presence of isoquinoline-derived alkaloids. Based on molecular and morphological data, the family forms a clade with the families Lardizabalaceae, Circaeasteraceae, Menispermaceae, Berberidaceae and Ranunculaceae.

Genera 
The broad circumscription of Papaveraceae in the APG III system includes three taxa that have previously been separated into different families: the Papaveraceae sensu stricto, the Fumariaceae and the Pteridophyllaceae. Thus the Cronquist system of 1981 recognised the Fumariaceae as a separate family, despite their close phylogenetic relationship to the Papaveraceae sensu stricto. The three former families may be treated as subfamilies. One morphological and molecular study concluded that the former family Pteridophyllaceae has a basal position with a subsequent division into two terminal clades each containing one of the subfamilies Fumarioideae and Papaveroideae, which are clearly monophyletic. A more recent study includes the former Pteridophyllaceae in the Fumarioideae, dividing the Papaveraceae into only two subfamilies.

The internal division of the Fumarioideae shown below follows Lidén (1993), with the exception of the placement of Pteridophyllum. The subtribes are given by the Germplasm Resources Information Network. The division of the Papaveroideae follows Hoot et al. (1997). In the latter study, the tribe Eschscholzieae would be the basal clade and sister group to the rest of the subfamily, which is divided into a different terminal clade (Chelidonieae) and into its sister group, formed by the Papavereae and Platystemoneae, whose separation is not based on the data presented by these authors. For discussions of subfamilies, see Carolan et al. (2006) and Blattner & Kadereit (1999).

Fumarioideae
Subfamily Fumarioideae Eaton
Tribe Hypecoeae Dumort.
Hypecoum L. – Mediterranean region to Mongolia and Western China.
Pteridophyllum Siebold & Zucc. – Japan
Tribe  Dumort.
Subtribe 
Adlumia Raf. ex DC. – Eastern North America, Korea, China
Capnoides Mill. – Northern North America
Corydalis DC. nom. cons. – Eurasia, North America, East Africa
Dactylicapnos Wall. – Himalayas
Dicentra Bernh. nom. cons. – Eastern Asia, North America
Ehrendorferia Fukuhara & Lidén – Western United States
Ichtyoselmis Lidén & Fukuhara – China
Lamprocapnos Endl. – China, Korea
Subtribe 
Ceratocapnos Durieu – South west of Europe, north west of Africa
Cryptocapnos Rech.f. – Central Afghanistan
Cysticapnos Mill. – South Africa
Discocapnos Cham. & Schltdl. – South Africa
Fumaria L. – Mediterranean region, Himalayas, East Africa
Fumariola Korsh. – Central Asia
Platycapnos (DC.) Bernh. – Western Mediterranean region
Pseudofumaria Medik. – Italy, Balkans
Rupicapnos Pomel – North west Africa
Sarcocapnos DC. – Spain, Morocco, Algeria
Trigonocapnos Schltr. – South Africa

Papaveroideae
Subfamily Papaveroideae Eaton
Tribe  Baill.
Dendromecon Benth. – California.
Eschscholzia Cham. – Western North America.
Hunnemannia Sweet – Eastern Mexico.
Tribe  Dumort.
Bocconia L. – Central and southern America, Antilles
Chelidonium L. – Eurasia
Dicranostigma Hook.f. & Thomson – Central Asia
Eomecon Hance – Eastern China
Glaucium Mill. – Europe to Central Asia
Hylomecon Maxim. – Eastern Asia
Macleaya R.Br. – Eastern Asia
Sanguinaria L. – Eastern North America
Stylophorum Nutt. – Eastern North America, Eastern Asia
Tribe  Spach
Hesperomecon Greene – Western North America
Meconella Nutt. – Western North America
Platystemon Benth. – Western North America
Tribe  Dumort.
Arctomecon Torr. & Frém. – Western North America
Argemone L. – North America, Antilles, central and southern America, Hawaii
Canbya Parry – Western North America
Cathcartia Hook.f. – China and the Himalayas, split from Meconopsis
Meconopsis Vig. – Central southern Asia, western Europe; paraphyletic
Papaver L. – Northern hemisphere, South Africa, Cape Verde; paraphyletic
Roemeria Medik. – Mediterranean region, south west Asia
Romneya Harv. – California
Stylomecon G. Taylor – California

Ecology 

Pollination is entomophile (basically by flies and wasps and bees, less often by beetles), except in Bocconia and Macleaya. In Papaveroideae, the reward is pollen as there is no nectar. The visual attractant is the petals that are usually brightly coloured and often have basal guides, sometimes the attractant can also be the androecium as the petals do not last long. Some species, mostly those from the arctic and alpine regions, reinforce their attraction with floral fragrance (for example, Papaver alpinum smells of cloves), which in the case of Romneya drugs the insects. The anthers and stigmas mature at the same time, but Bocconia is clearly protogynous, the stigmas emerge from the calyx that encloses them. Autopollination is common and in some cases (for example, Roemeria hybrida) it occurs before the bud opens (cleistogamy). The presence of an aril suggests dispersion of seeds by ants (myrmecochory), once they have been expelled by the fruit. In the case of Bocconia the seeds remain attached to the replums after the capsule's valves have fallen leaving their brilliant red or orange arils exposed, which attract birds to feed on them, facilitating their dispersal (ornithochory). Seeds that lack an aril appear to be dispersed by the wind (anemochory) for capsules that open, in the other cases they are freed when the fruit decomposes. Many Fumarioideae species have explosive fruits (ballistic), while Rupicapnos and Sarcocapnos species are chasmophytes, growing on rocks, and their fruit's peduncles and pedicels are geotropic and they lengthen so that the seeds bury into the base of the plant.

The Papaveroideae typically grow in cooler and wooded areas, forming part of the undergrowth. They have adapted to arctic and alpine habitats and to arid, Mediterranean areas, many species are ruderal and segetal (growing in cornfields). The Fumarioideae are basically found in open, rocky, alpine landscapes or vertical or overhanging cracks, while some species are ruderal or segetal.

Phytochemistry 

Alkaloids: The isoquinolinic alkaloids present in the family are well known. They are derived from berberine, tetrahydroberberine, protopine and benzophenanthridine in Papaveroideae, and from spirobenzylisoquinoline and cularine in Fumarioideae, as well as from other groups that give them pharmacological properties: derivatives of aporphine, morphinan, pavine, isopavine, narceine and rhoeadine.

Others: Other characteristic substances contained within these species include: meconic acid and chelidonic acid, as well as cyanogenic glycoside compounds derived from tyrosine: dhurrin and triglochinin; in the Fumarioideae while the Chelidonieae contain the free amino acid δ-acetylornithine.

Flavonoids: Iridoids and proanthocyanidins absent. Flavonols, kaempferol and/or quercetin present.

Many of these plants are poisonous. The Mexican prickly poppy is poisonous if taken internally and may cause oedema and glaucoma. Even if an animal, such as a goat, should persist in grazing on this plant, not only will the animal suffer but so will those who drink its milk, because the poisons are passed along in the milk.

Fossil record
The fossils of the late Cretaceous poppy Palaeoaster inquirenda from the Western Interior of North America occurs from 74.5 million year old deposits in the Fruitland Formation in New Mexico to 64.5 million year old deposits in the Hell Creek Formation in North Dakota. Dehiscent fruit fossils of Palaeoaster have been found at the excavation site for the well known Tyrannosaurus rex specimen BHI 3033. The seed capsule of Palaeoaster has some similarities to that of the extant poppy genus Romneya.

Papaverites a fruit from the Eocene of Germany may be associated with Papaveraceae. Chesters et al. (1967) mentions Papaver pictum from the Oligocene of England.

Cultivation 

The family is well known for its striking flowers, with many species grown as ornamental plants, including California poppy (Eschscholtzia californica, the California state flower), the stunning blue Himalayan poppies (Meconopsis), several species of Papaver, and the wildflower bloodroot. Only two species are of economic importance for the production of opium and its derivatives for pharmaceutical use: Papaver somniferum is cultivated legally in order to obtain morphine and other opiates, and Papaver bracteatum, for thebaine. Papaver somniferum is also the source of the poppy seeds used in cooking and baking, and poppy seed oil. The illegal cultivation of poppies in Asia for the production of opium and heroin is virtually equal to the legal production in the rest of the world. Some Funarioideae have a limited use in gardening, with Lamprocapnos spectabilis ("bleeding heart"), and Pseudofumaria lutea ("yellow corydalis") commonly used. Chinese traditional medicine used the boiled and dried tubers of Corydalis yanhusuo ("yanhusuo").

Symbolism

The opium poppy and corn poppy are symbols, respectively, of sleep and death. In Great Britain, Canada, the United States, and Australia the corn poppy is worn in remembrance of World War I.

References

Bibliography 

 In 

 In 
 In 

 (pbk.)

External links 

Papaveraceae in Topwalks
Papaveraceae  [sensu stricto] in L. Watson and M.J. Dallwitz (1992 onwards). The families of flowering plants .
Papaveraceae [sensu lato] in the Flora of North America
links at CSDL
Family Papaveraceae  Flowers in Israel
Mapa de Pteridophylloideae
Mapa de Papaveroideae
Mapa de Fumarioideae

 
Eudicot families